This is a list of the native living mammals of New Zealand. It does not include introduced species, nor extinct Saint Bathans fauna. There are around 51 native mammal species in New Zealand, of which three are critically endangered, three are endangered, three are vulnerable, and one is near threatened.

The following tags are used to highlight each species' conservation status as assessed by the International Union for Conservation of Nature:

Order: Chiroptera (bats)

The most distinguishing feature of bats is that their forelimbs are developed as wings, making them the only mammals capable of flight. Bat species account for about 20% of all mammals. Three species are found in New Zealand.

Family: Mystacinidae
Genus: Mystacina
 New Zealand greater short-tailed bat, M. robusta , possibly 
 New Zealand lesser short-tailed bat, M. tuberculata 
Family: Vespertilionidae
Subfamily: Vespertilioninae
Genus: Chalinolobus
 New Zealand long-tailed bat, Chalinolobus tuberculatus

Order: Cetacea (whales, dolphins and porpoises)

The order Cetacea includes whales, dolphins and porpoises. They are the mammals most fully adapted to aquatic life with a spindle-shaped nearly hairless body, protected by a thick layer of blubber, and forelimbs and tail modified to provide propulsion underwater. New Zealand is the first country in the world to protect marine mammals by law.

Suborder: Mysticeti
Family: Balaenidae
Genus: Eubalaena
 Southern right whale, Eubalaena australis 
Family: Balaenopteridae
Subfamily: Balaenopterinae
Genus: Balaenoptera
 Southern minke whale, Balaenoptera bonaerensis 
 Dwarf minke whale, Balaenoptera sp. 
 Bryde's whale, Balaenoptera edeni 
 Sei whale, Balaenoptera borealis 
 Fin whale, Balaenoptera physalus 
 Blue whale, Balaenoptera musculus 
Subfamily: Megapterinae
Genus: Megaptera
 Humpback whale, Megaptera novaeangliae 
Family: Neobalaenidae
Genus: Caperea
 Pygmy right whale, Caperea marginata 
Suborder: Odontoceti
Superfamily: Platanistoidea
Family: Phocoenidae
Genus: Phocoena
 Spectacled porpoise, Phocoena dioptrica 
Family: Physeteridae
Genus: Physeter
 Sperm whale, Physeter macrocephalus 
Family: Kogiidae
Genus: Kogia
 Pygmy sperm whale, Kogia breviceps 
 Dwarf sperm whale, Kogia sima 
Family: Ziphidae
Genus: Ziphius
 Cuvier's beaked whale, Ziphius cavirostris 
Genus: Berardius
 Arnoux's beaked whale, Berardius arnuxii 
Genus: Tasmacetus
 Shepherd's beaked whale, Tasmacetus shepherdi 
Subfamily: Hyperoodontinae
Genus: Hyperoodon
 Southern bottlenose whale, Hyperoodon planifrons 
Genus: Mesoplodon
 Andrews' beaked whale, Mesoplodon bowdoini 
 Blainville's beaked whale, Mesoplodon densirostris 
 Ginkgo-toothed beaked whale, Mesoplodon ginkgodens 
 Gray's beaked whale, Mesoplodon grayi 
 Hector's beaked whale, Mesoplodon hectori 
 Layard's beaked whale, Mesoplodon layardii 
Family: Delphinidae (marine dolphins)
Genus: Cephalorhynchus
 Hector's dolphin, Cephalorhynchus hectori 
 Maui's dolphin, Cephalorhynchus hectori maui 
Family: Phocoenidae (marine dolphins)
Genus: Phocoena
 Spectacled porpoise, Phocoena dioptrica 
Genus: Steno
 Rough-toothed dolphin, Steno bredanensis  vagrant
Genus: Tursiops
 Common bottlenose dolphin, Tursiops truncatus 
Genus: Stenella
 Pantropical spotted dolphin, Stenella attenuata  vagrant
 Striped dolphin, Stenella coeruleoalba  (southernmost record of the species occurred in 2017)
 Spinner dolphin, Stenella longirostris  vagrant
Genus: Delphinus
 Long-beaked common dolphin, Delphinus capensis 
 Short-beaked common dolphin, Delphinus delphis 
Genus: Lagenorhynchus
 Hourglass dolphin, Lagenorhynchus cruciger 
 Dusky dolphin, Lagenorhynchus obscurus 
Genus: Lissodelphis
 Southern right whale dolphin, Lissodelphis peronii 
Genus: Grampus
 Risso's dolphin, Grampus griseus 
Genus: Pseudorca
 False killer whale, Pseudorca crassidens 
Genus: Orcinus
 Orca, Orcinus orca 
Genus: Globicephala
 Short-finned pilot whale, Globicephala macrorhynchus 
 Long-finned pilot whale, Globicephala melas

Order: Carnivora (carnivorans)

Most carnivorans feed primarily on meat. They have distinctive skull shape and teeth. Seven species are found in New Zealand, all of which are pinnipeds.
Suborder: Caniformia
Family: Otariidae (eared seals, sealions)
Genus: Arctocephalus
 New Zealand fur seal, A. forsteri 
 Subantarctic fur seal, A. tropicalis  vagrant
Genus: Phocarctos
 New Zealand sea lion, P. hookeri 
Family: Phocidae (earless seals)
Genus: Hydrurga
 Leopard seal, H. leptonyx 
Genus: Leptonychotes
 Weddell seal, L. weddellii  vagrant
Genus: Lobodon
 Crabeater seal, L. carcinophaga  vagrant
Genus: Mirounga
 Southern elephant seal, M. leonina

See also
Fauna of New Zealand
Mammals of New Zealand
Pacific Islands Cetaceans Memorandum of Understanding

Notes

References
 

New Zealand
Mammals

New Zealand